Kurukshethram is a 1970 Indian Malayalam film, directed by P. Bhaskaran and produced by B. S. Ranga. The film stars Sathyan, Sheela, Adoor Bhasi and P. J. Antony in the lead roles. The film had musical score by K. Raghavan.

Cast
Sathyan as Balakrishnan
Sheela as Sethulakshmi
Adoor Bhasi 
P. J. Antony 
B. K. Pottekkad
Adoor Bhavani 
Aranmula Ponnamma 
Kottarakkara Sreedharan Nair 
Paravoor Bharathan

Soundtrack
The music was composed by K. Raghavan and the lyrics were written by P. Bhaskaran.

References

External links
 

1970 films
1970s Malayalam-language films
Films directed by P. Bhaskaran